Reuben Sechele Nyangweso (born 1961) is  a Kenyan politician who was a member of Kakamega County Assembly in Kenya representing Butsotso South. He was the first Leader of majority in the Assembly until 2014. He now holds the office of Chairman of Chairman of the County Public Service Board. He is the vice chair of the Liaison  committee and a member of the labor committee Kakamega County Assembly  he was elected to the County Assembly under the CORD coalition through the Orange Democratic Movement where he has been the deputy Chair for Lurambi since 2008 
In the capacity as first leader of majority, Reuben presented the first ever County budget for approval by the Assembly.

Family life
Reuben Sechele Nyangweso was born in 1960 at Mwiyenga village in Kakamega, fifth born of ten siblings  in the family of Mr Fredrick Nyangweso Obiero  (1931-2006) and Mrs Jeniffer Okeno Nyangweso (1933-1998). He is from  the Abashibo  sub-clan of the Butsotso of the Luhya people who make 14% of the total population of Kenya. He is married to Mrs Phoebe Nyangweso and they have four  children two daughters and two sons.

Career
Reuben graduated from the Medical Training Center Nairobi with a Diploma in Pharmaceutical technology (1982). Reuben worked for the Kenya ministry of health then went to work for central bank of Kenya before branching into business. He is a director of  Holfar Products and a partner in a publishing company  in Nairobi. He has worked with the Read for the Top project run by Canadian NGO Tembo Kenya donating and providing reading books for the schools in Kakamega County. He spent several years in Canada and he spend some time at  Carleton University studying Political Science (1999). His years in Canada gave him an opportunity to experience western work culture by working  for two years as  a Pharmaceutical Technologist in Loblaw Companies   he is currently pursuing a bachelor's degree in community health and development at the Jomo Kenyatta University of agriculture and technology

Academics
Reuben holds a B.Sc (Community Health & Development) from Jomo Kenyatta University of Agriculture and Technology JKUAT, a DipPharm (KMTC-Nrb) and a CPhT from (Ontario College of Pharmacists - 2002).  He studied Political Science at Carleton University in Ottawa Canada

Politics

Nyangweso first tried his hand in elective politics in 1997 when he ran a very successful campaign against the KANU establishment candidate and won the nomination but was narrowly beaten by the opposition candidate for the Lurambi constituency seat. It was whispered that the KANU establishment decided to lose the seat rather than have someone within the party whom they could not control. He tried again for that seat and was unsuccessful. Reuben was very active in the constitutional referendum and after the establishment of the counties he rightfully realized that the responsibilities of the county governments would require enlighten leadership. He thus opted to run for county representative and was elected to the Kakamega County Assembly. He served as the leader of the majority in the Kakamega county Assemble in the first session of the County assemble. In 2014  he was elected to the Chair of the Kakamega County Public Service & County Administration Committee as well as Vice Chair of Liaison Committee between the Legislative and Executive.
Kakamega County is one of the largest counties in Kenya by population and resources; the county government is expected to convert people's expectations into tangible results, Reuben plans to play a key role in that transformation.

Leadership
On 8 May 2013 Reuben led other County representatives in Kakamega in a coordinated walkout to assert their right to the constitutionally mandated pay and other compensation which the National government wanted to reduce, obstinately to reduce cost but overtly to test the will of the counties to protect their turf.
In early 2013 police investigated an incident in which the majority leader in the Kakamega County Assembly, Mr. Reuben Nyangweso, allegedly threatened a Kenya Power worker with a pistol. ( and ) This allegation was found without merit, and the police apologized to Mr. Nyangweso. Mr. Nyangweso runs a pharmacy and other businesses in Kakamega town besides serving the county as their elected representative.

The USA Government Affairs Institute of Georgetown University ( GAI) provides courses and training for public servants to optimize the relationships between and among the various branches of government. On 29 February to March 3 GU held the Executive – Legislative branches relations course. One notable attendee was Hon Reuben Nyangweso of Kakamega County Assemble. He was notable because he was the only foreign attendee among the various high ranking US government officials attending. It’s necessary that both branches learn to work together within the bounds of the law. This course curriculum and presenters emphasized the importance of each branch of government observing the founder’s intent.
GAI’s mission is to provide education and training about congressional processes, organization, and practices, and about selected legislative policy issues. By better understanding the functions and organization of Congress, executive branch personnel and others with a direct interest in federal programs can more effectively plan, manage, and budget for those programs, and better represent those programs before Congress.

References

1960 births
Living people
Kenyan Luhya people
People from Kakamega County
Wiper Democratic Movement – Kenya politicians